Evangelicals are an indie rock band from Norman, Oklahoma. Currently there are four members of the group:	Josh Jones (lead vocals, guitar), Kyle Davis (bass guitar, keyboards), Austin Stephens (drums) and Todd Jackson (guitar). Their music is renowned for its energy and unabashed enthusiasm. Their 2006 debut album, So Gone issued by Misra Records, received an 8.1/10 score from Pitchfork Media.  They are currently signed to Dead Oceans Records. In January 2008 they released The Evening Descends, which scored 8.3 from Pitchfork.

Discography

Albums
So Gone - Misra, 2006
The Evening Descends - Dead Oceans, 2008

References

External links
Evangelicals feature story on Soundcheck Magazine
The Evangelicals on myspace.com
Dead Oceans Page

2004 establishments in Oklahoma
Indie rock musical groups from Oklahoma
Musical groups established in 2004
Musicians from Norman, Oklahoma
Dead Oceans artists
Misra Records artists